Penicillium viridicatum is a psychrophilic species of fungus in the genus , penicillic acid and citrinin. Penicillium viridicatum can spoil grapes and melons.

Further reading

References 

viridicatum
Fungi described in 1911